
Yates Mill is a fully restored, circa 1756 gristmill located five miles (8 km) south of downtown Raleigh, North Carolina, United States. It is the centerpiece of Historic Yates Mill County Park, in central Wake County. The park features the restored mill; a visitor center with a museum focused on milling and on the natural history of the area, classrooms, an auditorium and space for research conducted by North Carolina State University faculty and students; a  lake; and extensive hiking trails. The park is managed as a native wildlife refuge with a mission to study and interpret the park's cultural, natural and agricultural heritage.

History 
Yates Mill, one of the oldest buildings in Wake County, is the region's only surviving operable gristmill. For nearly 200 years the water-powered mill produced lumber, milled corn and wheat, and carded wool. The land on which the mill is situated was surveyed for Samuel Pearson in October 1756, and granted to him by the Earl of Granville, one of the North Carolina colony's Lord Proprietors. The original mill was built around at that time. In 1819, accumulated debts forced Pearson's son, Simon, to sell the mill and its surrounding acreage at a sheriff's auction. William Boylan, a prominent Raleigh businessman and director of the State Bank, bought the property, and over the next 30 years modernized the mill several times, adding a sawmill in the 1840s.

In 1853, Thomas Briggs, John Primrose, and James Penny acquired the mill. A decade later, in the midst of the Civil War, the partners sold the mill and surrounding  to Phares and Roxanna Yates, James Penny's son-in-law and daughter. Penny's involvement in the murder of a Mr. Franklin may have brought on the sale. According to legend, Franklin was a Northern sympathizer who Penny killed for not paying a $700 mill debt. In 1865, Franklin's widow supposedly told Federal troops occupying Raleigh that her husband's death was due to his support for the Union. The soldiers tried to burn the mill by setting fire to the entrance. Charred wooden beams today attest to the unsuccessful attempt.

Yates and his descendants operated the mill until 1948, when businessman A. E. Finley acquired the property. Finley constructed a retreat lodge by the millpond for the use of his family and employees. Due to lack of demand, however, the old mill was closed in 1953. Ten years later, North Carolina State University acquired the property, consolidating it into a larger tract to be used as an experimental farm. The mill was mainly used for storage until 1989, when Yates Mill Associates was incorporated to marshal its restoration. The mill narrowly escaped destruction in 1996, when rains unleashed by Hurricane Fran burst its 250-year-old stone dam. In 1996, Yates Mill Associates and Wake County Parks, Recreation and Open Space unveiled a public-private partnership to rehabilitate the dam and mill as part of a  historic and environmental park. Yates Mill is now a designated Raleigh Historic Landmark.

Current use 

The mill stood vacant for several years until Yates Mill Associates, Inc. began restoration efforts in 1988. The mill is an example of the Oliver Evans type of grist mill and has been restored to its state as of the mid-19th century. Both the corn and wheat grinding machinery have been restored. Several corn grindings have been held since the mill officially opened to the public on May 20, 2006. The mill is frequently open for historic tours and corn grinding is demonstrated on specific days.

Yates Mill Associates, Inc. restored the mill with donations from governmental agencies, North Carolina State University, foundations, corporations and private citizens. North Carolina State University provided  on a long-term lease and will use the park for ongoing natural history research.

The Wake County Parks, Recreation and Open Space Department oversaw the development of this  park. The County supervised the construction of the A.E. Finley Center for Education and Research, and provides the personnel and support needed to operate the park. Yates Mill Associates organizes and finances the maintenance of the mill and its demonstration using private donations and volunteer help.

See also 
List of Registered Historic Places in North Carolina

References

External links 

 Yates Mill Associates – Official website
 Guide to the Yates Mill Associates Records circa 1946-2016
 Historic Yates Mill County Park – Park website
 Video of Yates Mill
 Video showing the interior and exterior of the Mill from 2016

National Register of Historic Places in Raleigh, North Carolina
Buildings and structures in Raleigh, North Carolina
North Carolina State University
Parks in North Carolina
Pre-statehood history of North Carolina
Mill museums in North Carolina
Museums in Raleigh, North Carolina
Industry museums in North Carolina
Protected areas of Wake County, North Carolina
Geography of Raleigh, North Carolina
Grinding mills on the National Register of Historic Places in North Carolina
Industrial buildings completed in 1756
Grinding mills in North Carolina